The Porcupine Hills refer to various groups of hills and uplands located in the prairie provinces of Canada, specifically the provinces of Saskatchewan and Manitoba. They are part of the Manitoba Escarpment, which was the shoreline of the ancient glacial Lake Agassiz. The hills are located north-west of Swan River, Manitoba, and are the headwaters of the Swan River. The Porcupine Provincial Forest surrounds the area.

See also
Porcupine Provincial Forest
Porcupine Provincial Forest (Manitoba)
Porcupine Hills Provincial Park

References

Hills of Canada
Landforms of Manitoba
Hills of Saskatchewan